Botanical gardens in Norway have collections consisting entirely of Norway native and endemic species; most have a collection that include plants from around the world. There are botanical gardens and arboreta in all states and territories of Norway, most are administered by local governments, some are privately owned.
 Agder Natural History Museum and Botanical Garden, Kristiansand
 Arboretet og Botanisk hage, Milde, Bergen
 Botanisk hage, Tøyen, Oslo
 Ringve botanical garden, Trondheim
 Rogaland Aboret, Sandnes
 Stavanger Botanic Garden, Stavanger
 Arctic-Alpine Botanic Garden, Tromsø

References 

Norway
Botanical gardens